was a Japanese athlete. He competed in the men's pole vault at the 1932 Summer Olympics.

References

External links
 

1909 births
Year of death missing
Athletes (track and field) at the 1932 Summer Olympics
Japanese male pole vaulters
Olympic athletes of Japan
Place of birth missing